The 2017 All-Ireland Minor Football Championship was the GAA's premier inter-county gaelic football competition for under 18's. 31 county teams from Ireland competed (Kilkenny did not participate).

2017 was the final year of this competition with an under 18 age limit; an under 17 championship with a new format replaced it after a vote at the GAA congress on 26 February 2016.

The winners received the Tom Markham Cup.

Kerry won their fourth minor title in a row, defeating Derry in the final on 17 September 2017 by 6-17 to 1-08. This was the first time that any county had won four minor titles in a row.

Teams
Thirty one teams contested the championship as Kilkenny withdrew after competing in 2016. New York and London did not participate in this competition.

Format

Provincial Championships

Connacht, Leinster, Munster and Ulster organised four provincial championships. Each province determined the format for deciding their champions and it could have been a league, group, knock-out, double-elimination, etc. or a combination of these. The format for the 2017 championships are explained in the sections below.

All-Ireland

The four provincial winners play the four provincial runners-up in the All-Ireland quarter finals. Two semi-finals and a final follow. The final is normally played before the All-Ireland senior final on the third Sunday in September. All these matches are knock-out.

Provincial championships

Connacht Minor Football Championship

Connacht Format

All five Connacht counties competed in a straight knock-out format.

Connacht Main Draw

Connacht Quarter-final

Connacht Semi-finals

Connacht final

Leinster Minor Football Championship

Leinster Format

Preliminary round

The eleven participating Leinster teams competed in six matches in the preliminary round of the main draw, with (Offaly) playing two matches due to the odd number of teams.

Losers section

The six beaten teams entered the losers' section and played four play-off matches.  Two teams then re-entered the main draw at the quarter-final stage. From the quarter-finals all matches were played under a straight knock-out format.

Leinster Main Draw

Leinster Losers' Section Matches

The six beaten teams in the preliminary round of the main draw play-off in three matches. Three teams from the losers' section re-enter the main draw at the quarter-final stage.

Leinster First round

Leinster Losers Section

Leinster Quarter-finals

Leinster Semi-finals

Leinster final

Munster Minor Football Championship

Munster Format

All six Munster teams competed in the three quarter-finals of the main draw. The three beaten teams entered the play-off section and, after two play-off matches, one team re-entered the main draw at the semi-final stage. From the semi-finals all matches followed a knock-out format.

Munster Main Draw

Munster Playoff Rounds 1 and 2

The three beaten teams in the quarter-finals of the main draw competed in a play-off in two matches. The winning team from the play-offs re-entered the main draw at the semi-final stage.

Munster Quarter-finals

Munster Semi-finals

Munster final

Ulster Minor Football Championship

Ulster Format

All nine Ulster teams competed with the fixtures mirroring the senior fixtures i.e. if Derry are drawn to play Tyrone in their first match in the senior championship then Derry minors play Tyrone minors in their first match. Often the minor teams played immediately before the seniors. All matches followed a knock-out format.

The winners receive the Fr. Murray Cup.

Ulster Main Draw

Ulster Preliminary round

Ulster Quarter-finals

Ulster Semi-finals

Ulster final

All-Ireland

All-Ireland Main Draw

l

All-Ireland Quarter-finals

The four provincial champions played the four beaten finalists from the provincial championships.

All-Ireland Semi-finals

There was no draw for the semi-finals as the fixtures are pre-determined on a three yearly rotation. This rotation ensures that a provinces's champions play the champions of all the other provinces once every three years in the semi-finals, if they each win their quarter-finals. If a provincial winner loses their quarter final, then the provincial runner-up who beat them take their place in the semi-final.

All-Ireland final

Miscellaneous
 Kerry  win a fourth consecutive All-Ireland minor title. This is the first time this has been achieved since the beginning of the Minor Championship.
 Kerry set a new record of 24 consecutive wins since their last defeat in the 2013 All-Ireland Quarter-final defeat to Tyrone.

See also
 2017 All-Ireland Senior Football Championship
 2017 All-Ireland Under-21 Football Championship

References

All-Ireland Minor Football Championship
2017 in Gaelic football